Stefan Petrović (born September 8, 1983) is an Austrian footballer who plays for SV Gablitz. He was part of the FC Pasching squad that won the 2012–13 Austrian Cup.

Honours
Pasching
Austrian Cup: 2012–13

References

External links

1993 births
Living people
Austrian footballers
2. Liga (Austria) players
Austrian Regionalliga players
FC Juniors OÖ players
FC Liefering players
NK Zavrč players
Slovenian PrvaLiga players
Association football midfielders
Austrian expatriate footballers
Expatriate footballers in Germany
Austrian expatriate sportspeople in Germany
Expatriate footballers in Slovenia
Austrian expatriate sportspeople in Slovenia